Birgitta Eriksson, born 1948 in Hagfors, Sweden, is a Swedish social democratic politician who was a member of the Riksdag from  2006 until 2010.

External links
Birgitta Eriksson at the Riksdag website

1948 births
Living people
People from Hagfors
Members of the Riksdag from the Social Democrats
Women members of the Riksdag
21st-century Swedish women politicians
Members of the Riksdag 2006–2010